Paul L. Harris  (born 14 May 1946) is a British psychologist and academic specialising in child development. He is a professor at Harvard Graduate School of Education in Cambridge, Massachusetts.

Education 
Harris earned a B.A. in Psychology from Sussex University and a D. Phil.	in Psychology and Experimental Psychology from St John's College, Oxford.

Research 
Since 2001 he has been a professor at Harvard Graduate School of Education. His research focuses on how children use their imaginations, first-hand experience, and trust in what they're told, to understand the world.

Publications 
 The Development of Psychological Understanding, 1989. 
 Perspectives on the Child's Theory of Mind, edited, 1991, with G.E. Butterworth, A.M. Leslie, et H.M. Wellman.
 Children's Understanding of Emotions 1989, avec C. Saarni.
 Developing Theories of Mind 1988 with J.W. Astington et D.R. Olson.
 The Work of the Imagination 2000. 
 Imagining the Impossible: Magical, Scientific, and Religious Thinking in Children, co-editor, 2000, with K. S. Rosengren et C. N. Johnson.
 Trusting What You’re Told: How Children Learn from Others, 2015.

Awards 
 In 1998 he was elected a Fellow of the British Academy.
 In 2005 he was awarded a Guggenheim Fellowship.
 In 2006 he was made a member of the Norwegian Academy of Science and Letters.
 In 2007 he was granted an honorary Doctorate from the University de Rennes.
 In 2009 he was elected a Fellow of the Association for Psychological Science.
 In 2014 he was awarded the American Psychological Association Eleanor Maccoby Book Award in developmental psychology.
 In 2015 he was elected a Fellow of the American Academy of Arts and Sciences.

References 

Living people
English psychologists
1946 births
Alumni of St John's College, Oxford
Harvard Graduate School of Education faculty
Fellows of the British Academy
Fellows of the American Academy of Arts and Sciences
Fellows of the Association for Psychological Science
Place of birth missing (living people)
Alumni of the University of Sussex
Fellows of St John's College, Oxford
Members of the Norwegian Academy of Science and Letters